Thurso is a town in northern Scotland.

Thurso may also refer to:
 Thurso railway station, in the Scottish town
 Thurso, Quebec, a town in Canada
 River Thurso, in northern Scotland
 Thurso River, in South Island, New Zealand
 Viscount Thurso, a title in the peerage of the United Kingdom
 John Thurso (born 1953), a Scottish politician
 SS Thurso, a British cargo ship sunk during the Second World War
 "Thurso", a song by the Scottish band Over the Wall